Jack Haley (1897–1979) was an American actor.

Jack or John Haley may also refer to:

 Jack Haley Jr. (1933–2001), son of the actor, movie producer, notably of That's Entertainment!
 Jack Haley (basketball) (1964–2015), American basketball player
 John Haley (attorney), Arkansas lawyer involved in the Whitewater controversy
 John F. Haley, known as Jack, United States Army general
 John Wesley Haley, pastor, missionary and mission strategist
 Jackie Earle Haley (born 1961), American actor
 Bill Haley (1925–1981), American musician, who once used "Jack Haley" as a stage name

See also
 John Hailey, delegate to the U.S. House of Representatives from Idaho Territory